R. rubra  may refer to:
 Rallina rubra, the chestnut forest-rail, a bird species found in Indonesia and Papua New Guinea
 Rhamnus rubra, the red buckthorn, a flowering plant species
 Roseomonas rubra, a Gram-negative bacterium.

See also
 Rubra (disambiguation)